Samuel Lawrence may refer to:

Samuel Lawrence (Canadian politician) (1879–1959), Canadian politician
Samuel Lawrence (revolutionary) (1754–1827), war officer, founder of Lawrence Academy at Groton
Samuel Lawrence (congressman) (1773–1837), U.S. Representative from New York
Samuel T. Lawrence (1786–1847), early associate of Joseph Smith, the founder of the Latter-day Saint movement
Samuel Hill Lawrence (1831–1868), Irish Victoria Cross recipient
Samuel Laurence (1812–1884), British portrait painter, also spelt as Lawrence
Samuel C. Lawrence (1822–1911), Massachusetts politician

See also
Sam Lawrence, American entrepreneur